Karidi (also Romanized as Karīdī' and Kerīdī; also known as Kerendī) is a village in Gheyzaniyeh Rural District, in the Central District of Ahvaz County, Khuzestan Province, Iran. At the 2006 census, its population was 37, in 4 families.

References 

Populated places in Ahvaz County